The Heinkel HD 27 was a mail-carrying transport built in Germany in the 1920s.

Operational history
The HD 27 flew in 1925 and carried mail until 1928, when it was destroyed in a tornado. No more airframes were built, but the HD 27 formed the basis for the HD 39.

Specifications

References

Further reading

External links

1920s German cargo aircraft
HD 27
Biplanes
Aircraft first flown in 1925